Diuris chrysantha, commonly known as granite donkey orchid, is a species of orchid that is endemic to eastern Australia. It has one or two leaves and up to seven deep golden to orange-coloured flowers with brown markings and occurs on the ranges and tablelands north from Tamworth to the Darling Downs.

Description
Flowering occurs from August to November.

Taxonomy and naming
Diuris chrysantha was first formally described in 1987 by David Jones and Mark Clements from a specimen collected near Stanthorpe and the description was published in Proceedings of the Royal Society of Queensland. The specific epithet (chrysantha) is derived from the Ancient Greek words chrysos meaning "gold" and anthos meaning "flower".

Distribution and habitat
The granite donkey orchid grows in grassy forest on the ranges and tablelands north from Tamworth to the Darling Downs.

References

chrysantha
Endemic orchids of Australia
Orchids of New South Wales
Orchids of Queensland
Plants described in 1987